Everything We Had to Leave Behind is the eighth studio album by British electronic music artist Chicane. The album was officially announced on 26 February 2021, along with the release of the fourth single from the album "8 (Circle)". It was released on 23 April 2021 by Modena Records and Armada Music.

The album is unique in that every track, apart from 'Juno', was released as a single.

Track listing

Charts

References 

2021 albums
Armada Music albums
Chicane (musician) albums